The 1912 Acambay earthquake struck the State of Mexico on 19 November at 07:55 local time. Up to 161 people died and there was severe destruction. It is regarded as one of the most important earthquakes in Mexico's seismological history, having been widely studied.

Tectonic setting
These plates subduct off Mexico's Pacific coast and plunge about  beneath the volcanic belt. Seismicity occur along the subducting plates. However, the volcanic belt also produces shallow intraplate earthquakes along faults within. Although these earthquakes are rare, they can measure up to  7.6 and be destructive. Most of these earthquakes are due to normal faulting while small components of strike-slip have been determined through seismic inversion.

Earthquake
Only two major earthquakes of the Trans-Mexican Volcanic Belt have been instrumentally recorded; the 1912 Acambay and 1920 Xalapa earthquakes. Located just northwest of Mexico City, the 1912 earthquake is regarded as the closest shallow intraplate earthquake to the city. The geology of the city, consisting of soft clay deposits from an ancient lake, arriving seismic waves are amplified, causing large ground motions. The estimated Modified Mercalli intensity in the city was VII–VIII.

The earthquake ruptured the Acambay-Tixmadejé Fault, a north-bounding fault of the Acambay graben. It is a normal fault that dips 60–70° to the south. A -long surface rupture was observed with a fault scarp of ≥. Surface ruptures were well documented and photographed by geologists. About 60 aftershocks were recorded from 19 November 1912 to 15 April 1913.

Impact
Between 140 and 161 people were killed in Acambay, Timilpan and Tixmadejé. Victims perished during the collapse of colonial-era buildings. Brick, adobe baroque-style structures were destroyed. In Acambay, every home was destroyed and a church toppled during a mass. Mexico City was damaged. Many historical structures were destoyed. Reconstruction of the affected communities began in 1913. A maximum seismic intensity of X was assigned in Acambay and Tixmadejé.

See also 
List of earthquakes in 1912
List of earthquakes in Mexico

References

1912 earthquakes
Earthquakes in Mexico
November 1912 events in North America
1912 in Mexico
History of the State of Mexico
1912 disasters in Mexico